Pathein Stadium is a multi-use stadium in Pathein, Burma.  It is currently used mostly for football matches and is the home ground of Ayeyawady United of the Myanmar National League.  The stadium holds 6,000 spectators.

External links
 Stadium information

Football venues in Myanmar